The Wirt County Courthouse in Elizabeth, West Virginia was built to replace a courthouse that burned May 15, 1910. The new neoclassical courthouse was designed by B.F. Smith and subsequently built by his company. The courthouse is the most significant building in the small community of Elizabeth, with a population of less than 1000. The brick courthouse features a two-story columned pediment and is surmounted by a clock tower.

References

Courthouses on the National Register of Historic Places in West Virginia
Neoclassical architecture in West Virginia
Government buildings completed in 1911
Buildings and structures in Wirt County, West Virginia
County courthouses in West Virginia
Clock towers in West Virginia
National Register of Historic Places in Wirt County, West Virginia
1911 establishments in West Virginia